Abdul Khaleque (born 1 February 1971) is an Indian politician belonging to Indian National Congress party and Member of Parliament from Barpeta constituency of Assam. Previously he served as a member of Assam Legislative Assembly from Jania Constituency.

Career 
He has been elected to that legislative body twice: First in 2006 from the 44 no Jania, Barpeta district, and second from the same constituency in 2016. Khaleque is a member of the Indian National Congress.

Khaleque has proposed that the government provincialize all venture schools, condemned government drives to eviction of landless people from government land, and opposed the proposed dissolution of the Assam Chah Mazdoor Sangha.

Education
Abdul Khaleque had completed his primary Education from Bartary LP school and Langla HS School. He became graduated from Bongaigaon College and then Completed MA from Gauhati University in Assamese literature. He has again done MA in International Relations.

Social & Literacy Works
He is an education promoter as well as writer. His recent works are published in various books as well as his own books.

Personal life
Khaleque had completed primary education at Bartary village under Barbhitha GP and later completed his graduation and PG from Bongaigaon college under Gauhati University. He has married Kamlani Khaleque and the couple has 2 children.

 He has been brutally trolled for a tweet where he said Lionel Messi was born in Indian state of Assam.

References 

Living people
Place of birth missing (living people)
Assam politicians
Assam MLAs 2006–2011
Assam MLAs 2016–2021
1971 births
People from Barpeta district
India MPs 2019–present
Indian National Congress politicians from Assam